HMS Ribble was a Yarrow-type River-class destroyer ordered by the Royal Navy under the 1901 – 1902 Naval Estimates.  Named after the River Ribble in northern England, she was the first ship to carry this name in the Royal Navy.

Construction
She was laid down on 4 July 1902 at the Yarrow shipyard at Poplar and launched on 19 March 1904.  Her build was completed in June 1904.  Her original armament was to be the same as the turtleback torpedo boat destroyers that preceded her.  In 1906 the Admiralty decided to upgrade the armament by fitting three 12-pounder 8 hundredweight (cwt) guns instead of the five 6-pounder guns.  Two were mounted abeam at the foc'x'le break and the third gun was mounted on the quarterdeck.

Service history
After commissioning she was assigned to the East Coast Destroyer Flotilla of the 1st Fleet and based at Harwich.

On 27 April 1908 the Eastern Flotilla departed Harwich for live fire and night manoeuvres.  During these exercises  rammed and sank  then collided with Ribble and holed her below the waterline.  She had to put into Sheerness for repairs.

In 1909/1910 she was assigned to the China Station.

On 30 August 1912 the Admiralty directed that all destroyer classes were to be designated by letters.  The ships of the River class were assigned to the E class and after 30 September 1913, she was known as an E-class destroyer and had the letter ‘E’ painted on the hull below the bridge area and on either the fore or aft funnel.

Ribble was assigned to patrol duties under the command of the commodore at Hong Kong.

On 17 March 1915, she closed on the French battleship Bouvet after she struck a mine in the Dardanelles.

On 25 April 1915, under the command of Lieutenant Commander R W Wilkinson, she supported the landings at ANZAC Cove.

By 10 February 1916 Ribble was on the Smyrna Patrol enforcing the blockade of the Turkish coast from Cape Kaba to latitude 38°30’E, a distance of 200 nautical miles, and including the port of Smyrna.  At this time she was based at Port Iero on the island of Lesbos. She remained in the Mediterranean until the end of the war.

In 1919 she returned to home waters, was paid off and laid up in reserve awaiting disposal.  On 29 July 1920 she was sold to Thos. W. Ward of Sheffield for breaking, appropriately given her name, on the River Ribble at Preston, Lancashire.

She was awarded the battle honour "Dardanelles 1915 - 1916" for her service

References

Bibliography
 
 
 
 
 
 
 

 

River-class destroyers
1904 ships
Ships built on the River Thames
Maritime incidents in 1908